Andreea Nicoleta Boghian (born 29 November 1991 in Gura Humorului) is a Romanian rower. She won four European championships in the eight and one in the coxless pair. Boghian won a bronze medal in the eight at the 2016 Summer Olympics.

References

External links
 
 
 
 

1991 births
Living people
People from Gura Humorului
Romanian female rowers
World Rowing Championships medalists for Romania
Olympic bronze medalists for Romania
Medalists at the 2016 Summer Olympics
Olympic medalists in rowing
Rowers at the 2016 Summer Olympics
Olympic rowers of Romania
European Rowing Championships medalists